Wesley Studi (born December 17, 1947) is a Native American (Cherokee Nation) actor and film producer. He has garnered critical acclaim and awards throughout his career, particularly for his portrayal of Native Americans in film. He has appeared in Academy Award-winning films, such as Dances with Wolves (1990) and The Last of the Mohicans (1992), and in the Academy Award-nominated films Geronimo: An American Legend (1993) and The New World (2005). He is also known for portraying Sagat in Street Fighter (1994). Other films he has appeared in are Hostiles, Heat, Mystery Men, Avatar, A Million Ways to Die in the West, and the television series Penny Dreadful. In 2019, he received an Academy Honorary Award, becoming the first Native American and the second Indigenous person from North America to be honored by the Academy (the first was Buffy Sainte-Marie). 

In December 2020, The New York Times ranked him #19 in its list of the "25 Greatest Actors of the 21st Century (So Far)," noting "Wes Studi has one of the screen’s most arresting faces — jutting and creased and anchored with the kind of penetrating eyes that insist you match their gaze. Lesser directors like to use his face as a blunt symbol of the Native American experience, as a mask of nobility, of suffering, of pain that’s unknowable only because no one has asked the man wearing it. In the right movie, though, Studi doesn’t just play with a character’s facade; he peels its layers. A master of expressive opacity, he shows you the mask and what lies beneath, both the thinking and the feeling."

Early life and education 
Studi was born in a Cherokee family in Nofire Hollow, Oklahoma, a rural area in Cherokee County named after his mother's family. He is the son of Maggie Studie, a housekeeper, and Andy Studie, a ranch hand. Until he attended elementary school, he spoke only Cherokee at home. He attended Chilocco Indian Agricultural School for high school and graduated in 1964; his vocational major was in dry cleaning.

At the age of 17, Studi enlisted in the Oklahoma National Guard and had his basic combat training and advanced individual training at Fort Polk, Louisiana. Studi volunteered for active service and went to Vietnam with A Company of the 3rd Battalion 39th Infantry, 9th Infantry Division, where he served for 12 months.

After his discharge, Studi became politically involved in American Indian activism. He participated in the Wounded Knee Incident at Pine Ridge Reservation in 1973. Studi stated in an interview that he first began acting while attending Tulsa Community College, after returning from his service in Vietnam. He had a role in the play The Royal Hunt of the Sun for the American Indian Theater Company.

Career 

Studi appeared in his first film, The Trial of Standing Bear, in 1988. He is known for his roles as ruthless Native American warriors, such as a Pawnee in Dances with Wolves (1990), and the Huron Magua in The Last of the Mohicans (1992).

A year later, he was cast with Eric Schweig for TNT's film The Broken Chain, about the historic Iroquois League that was based in the area of central and western present-day New York state. It was shot in Virginia. This was part of a group of productions shown over 14 months on TNT as its "Native American initiative", including three television movies and several documentaries. A six-hour history series was told from a Native American perspective. In 1993 Studi had the lead in Geronimo: An American Legend. He played the superhero Sphinx in the 1999 comedy film Mystery Men.

In 2002, Studi brought to life the character of Police Lieutenant Joe Leaphorn, for a series of PBS movies based on Tony Hillerman's novels set in the Southwest among the Navajo and Hopi. It was produced by Robert Redford. Some movie titles include "Skinwalkers", "Coyote Waits", "A Thief of Time".

In 2005, Studi portrayed a character based on chief Opechancanough, leader of the Powhatan Confederacy in Virginia, in the film The New World directed by Terrence Malick.

In 2009, Studi appeared as Major Ridge, a leader of the Cherokee before the Native American removal to Indian Territory, in Trail of Tears. This was the third of five episodes in the PBS series We Shall Remain, portraying critical episodes in Native American history after European encounter, part of the public television's acclaimed series American Experience, where Studi spoke only in native Cherokee.

Also in 2009, Studi appeared in James Cameron's Avatar. He played Eytukan, the chieftain of a Na'vi tribe, but did not have any dialogue in English. Studi played Cheyenne chief Yellow Hawk in a starring role in the 2017 film Hostiles.

At the 90th Academy Awards, Studi introduced a tribute to military movies, and gave part of his speech in the Cherokee language, of which he is a fluent speaker. Studi is the second Native American actor to present at the Academy Awards. Will Rogers hosted in 1934.

In 2019, he received an Academy Honorary Award, becoming the second Indigenous person to be honored, and the first Native American actor to receive an Oscar specifically for acting. In his acceptance speech, Studi said: "I’d simply like to say, it’s about time. It’s been a wild and wonderful ride, and I’m really proud to be here tonight as the first Indigenous Native American to receive an Academy Award. It’s a humbling honour to receive an award for something I love to do." The first Indigenous person from North America to win an Oscar was Buffy Sainte-Marie, a First Nations/Native American living in Canada, in 1983, for Best Original Song at the 55th Academy Awards.

Personal life 
After his studies, Studi taught the Cherokee language and syllabary and helped establish a Cherokee-language newspaper. He went into ranching. From his first marriage, Studi has a daughter, Leah, and a son, Daniel. After this marriage ended in divorce, Studi left ranching and started to study acting; a friend had recommended it as a place to meet women. Studi married Maura Dhu, and they moved their family to a farm near Santa Fe, New Mexico, in the early 1990s. Maura is the only child of Emmy- and Oscar-winning actor Jack Albertson. Wes and Maura Dhu Studi have a son, Kholan. Studi and his wife perform in the band, Firecat of Discord. Studi serves as honorary chair of the national endowment campaign of the Indigenous Language Institute in Santa Fe.

Studi endorsed Senator Bernie Sanders for President in the 2016 U.S. presidential election.

Honors 
 1994: Won a Western Heritage Award (shared with cast and crew) for Geronimo: An American Legend (1993).
 1998: The Dreamspeakers Film and Festival honored Studi with its Career Achievement Award.
 2000: Motion Picture and Television Fund's Golden Boot Award. 
 2000: Artist of the Decade at the First Americans in the Arts Awards. 
 2013: Inducted into the Hall of Great Western Performers - Western Heritage Award, Oklahoma City, OK
 2019: Academy Honorary Award.

Filmography

Film

Television

Notes

References

External links

 WesleyStudi.com 
 

1947 births
Native American actors
20th-century American male actors
21st-century American male actors
American male film actors
American male television actors
United States Army personnel of the Vietnam War
Articles containing video clips
Cherokee Nation artists
Living people
Male actors from Oklahoma
Native American male actors
Native American United States military personnel
People from Cherokee County, Oklahoma
Actors from Santa Fe, New Mexico
Tulsa Community College alumni
United States Army soldiers
Academy Honorary Award recipients
20th-century Native Americans
21st-century Native Americans